The von Borcke family also spelled von Bork, Borke or Borken, was a Pomeranian noble family of Slavic origin. Accordíng to Seweryn Uruski (1817-1890) the family was originally known as Borek or z Borku.
The family itself traces the name back to Pribislaus, son of Borko ("Pribislaus, Filius Borkonis"), who was mentioned in a medieval document in 1186/87. In 1297 Nikolaus Borko was the first to use this as a family name.

Borcke may refer to:
 Sidonia von Borcke (1548-1620), noble woman executed for witchcraft
 Georg Matthias von Borcke (1671-1740)
 Adrian Bernhard von Borcke (1668-1741)
 Kaspar Wilhelm von Borcke (1704-1747)
 Heinrich Adrian von Borcke (1715-1788) 
 Karl August Ferdinand von Borcke (1776-1830), general
 Johann Heinrich August Heros von Borcke (1835–1895), Prussian cavalry officer
 Fabian von Borcke (born 1966), politician

References

Pomeranian nobility
Surnames
Military families of Germany